The Eaton family is a prominent Canadian family of Scottish-Irish Methodist origin. Established in Toronto, the family dynasty began in 1869 when Timothy Eaton (1834–1907) founded Eaton's, which became a national chain of department stores. At its height, the family's net worth was around $2 billion. Although the Eaton's department store chain went bankrupt in 1999, the family still holds considerable wealth.

The Canadian Broadcasting Corporation and author Rod McQueen have dubbed them as "Canada's royal family", with the CBC describing the Eatons as "homegrown aristocracy", which drew comparisons to the influential Kennedy family. The Eatons were well known for their lavish lifestyle and occasional philanthropy.

Notable family members
Fredrik Gordon Eaton
  John Eaton (1784–1834), m. Margaret Craig (1796–1848)
 Robert Eaton (1816-1893)
 Eliza Jane Eaton (1819-1861)
 Mary Anne Eaton (1821-1841)
 Margaret Eaton (1824-1900)
 John Eaton (1827–1895), m. Margaret Herbison (1833–1907)
 William Herbison Eaton (1873-)
  (3) Robert Young Eaton (1875–1956), m. Hazel Ireland (1889–1965)
 Margaret Craig Eaton (1912-1988), m. John Hubert Dunn (1897-)
 John Wallace Eaton (1912–1990) (twin brother of Margaret), m. Phyllis Finlayson (1915-1997)
 Edith Elisabeth Nora Eaton (1913-2010), m. Paul Robert van der Stricht (1908-2004)
 Erskine Robert Eaton (1915–1942) (died in Dieppe Raid)
  Alan Young Eaton (1916-2000), m. Diana Fishleigh
 Nancy Eaton (1829-)
 Sarah Eaton (1831-)
 James Eaton (1832-1904)
  (1) Timothy Eaton (1834–1907), m. Margaret Wilson Beattie (1841–1933)
 Josephine Smyth Eaton (1865–1943), m. Thomas David Meldrum Burnside (1835–1900)
 Iris Margaret Burnside (1894–1915) (died on the RMS Lusitania)
  Allan Eaton Meldrum Burnside (1898-1937)
 Margaret Elizabeth Beattie Eaton (1867-1952), m. Charles Eldridge Burden (1863-)
 Margaret Beattie Eaton Burden (1898-), m. Billy Bishop (1894–1956)
  Henry John Burden (1894–1960)
 Edward Young Eaton (1871–1900), m. Tillie Robinson (1869-1895)
 Marjorie Tillie Eaton (1892-1952), m. Harold Simcoe Coulson (1884-1936)
   Alice Eaton (1894-), m. Edward Browse
   Edward Eaton, m. Nancy Leigh Gossage (1926-2007)
  Nancy Alice Edward Eaton (1961-1985) (murdered)
 William Fletcher Eaton (1875–1935), m. Gertrude Nora Cook (1877-)
 Josephine Norah Eaton (1900-), m. George Edward Leishman (1897-)
  Noel Beattie Eaton (1910–1996), m. Julia Isabell Fleming (1912–1989)
  (2) Sir John Craig Eaton (1876–1922), m. Flora McCrea (1879–1970), formally known as Lady Eaton
 Timothy Craig Eaton (1903–1986)
 (4) John David Eaton (1909–1973), m. Signy Hildur Stefansson (1913–1992)
 John Craig Eaton II (1937-), m. Sally Horsfall 
 John David Eaton (1961-)
 Signy Eaton (1962-)
  Henry Eaton (1965-)
 (5) Fredrik Stefan Eaton (1938–2021), m. Catherine Martin
 Fredrik D'Arcy Eaton
 Fredrik Gordon Eaton (2007-)
 William D'Arcy Neil Eaton (2008-)
  Flora Catherine Eaton Coakley
 Thor Edgar Eaton (1942-2017), m. Nicole Courtois (1945-)
 Thor Eaton
  Cleophée Eaton
  (6) George Ross Eaton (1945-)
 Edgar Allison Eaton (1912-1988), m. Mildred Jarvis Page (1915–1968)
 Gilbert McCrea Eaton (1915-1985), m. Marjorie Ann Maston (1913-1988)
 Florence Mary Eaton (1919–2012), m. Frank Flavelle McEachren (1918-1995)
  Evlyn Beatrice Eaton (1919?–1989) (adopted), m. Russell Payton (1915–1976)

Notes
 Not exhaustive – listing is generally restricted to siblings of Timothy Eaton, his children, their spouses, and significant descendants.
 (#) – order of succession as the head of Eaton's.

Eaton properties and monuments

See also
Timothy Eaton statue
Telegram Corporation

References

Further reading

External links
Ardwold mansion, Toronto – lostrivers.ca

 
Family
Canadian business families
Canadian families
Canadian socialites
Methodist families